Karl (also Carl) is an originally Germanic variant of the male given name Charles meaning free man, or simply a man. For further details on origin and meaning, see Churl and Charles.

Notable people with the name include:

Nobles
Karl, Truchsess von Waldburg (1548–1593), Imperial minister
Karl, Count Chotek of Chotkow and Wognin (1783–1868), Austrian chancellor, Government President and school reformer of Bohemia
Karl, Duke of Schleswig-Holstein-Sonderburg-Glücksburg (1813–1878), German duke
Karl, Prince of Isenburg-Büdingen (1838–1899), head of the German house of Isenburg and Büdingen
Karl, Freiherr von Prel (1839–1899), German philosopher and writer on mysticism and the occult
Karl I of Austria (1887–1922), the last Emperor of Austria
Karl, 8th Prince of Löwenstein-Wertheim-Rosenberg (1904–1990), German Roman Catholic nobleman

Given name

 Karl Albrecht (1920–2014), German entrepreneur and billionaire 
 Karl Auerbach (born 1949), computer scientist
 Karl Barth (1886–1968), seminal Swiss Reformed Theologian
 Karl Bartos (born 1952), German musician
 Karl Becker (general) (1879–1940), German engineer and officer
 Karl Becker (painter) (1820–1900), German painter
 Karl Becker (philologist) (1775–1849), German philologist
 Karl Beckersachs (1886–1951), German actor
 Karl Benz (1844–1929), German engineer
 Karl August Leopold Böhm (1894–1981), Austrian conductor
 Karl von In der Maur (1852–1913), Austrian statesman 
 Karl Blossfeldt (1865–1932), German artist
 Karl Bonatz (1882–1951), German architect
 Karl Brandt (1904–1948), German Nazi SS physician executed for war crimes
 Karl Briullov, Russian painter
 Karl Brugger (1941–1984), a German foreign correspondent for and author
 Karl Chmielewski, German Nazi SS concentration camp commandant
 Karl Chua (born 1978), Filipino economist
 Karl Dall (1941–2020), German comedian and singer
 Karl Davies (born 1982), English actor
 Karl Denke (1860-1924), prolific and cannibalistic German serial killer
 Karl Ludwig Diehl (1896–1958), German actor
 Karl Dönitz (1891–1980), German admiral
 Karl Duldig (1902–1986), Austrian-Australian sculptor
 Karl Etlinger (1879–1946), German actor
 Karl Farmer (born 1954), American football player
 Karl Fazer (1866–1932), Finnish businessman and sport shooter
 Karl Fritzsch (1903–1945), German Nazi SS concentration camp commandant who was the first to use Zyklon B for mass murder
 Karl Gebhardt (1897–1948), German Nazi SS physician who conducted criminal medical experiments, executed for war crimes.
Karl Green (1947-) British musician, bass player for British pop group Herman's Hermits.
 Karl Hammes (1896–1939), German operatic baritone and fighter pilot
 Karl Hannemann (1895–1953), German actor
 Karl Harst (1492–1563), German diplomat and assistant of Erasmus
 Karl Amadeus Hartmann (1905–1963), German composer
 Karl Haushofer (1869–1946), German geopolitician
 Karl Hechema (2010), American Photographer 
 Karl Hess (1923–1994), American comedian
 Karl Hoblitzelle (1879–1967), American theater owner and philanthropist
 Karl-Friedrich Höcker (1911–2000), German Nazi SS concentration camp officer and war criminal
 Karl Holz (Nazi) (1895–1945), German Nazi
 Karl Jaspers (1883–1969), German philosopher
 Karl Kalkun (1927–1990), Estonian actor
 Karl Heinrich Kaufhold (1932–2020), German economic historian
 Karl-Otto Koch (1897–1945), German Nazi commandant of concentration camps
 Karl Kraus (writer) (1874–1936), Austrian writer
 Karl Christian Friedrich Krause (1781–1832), German philosopher
 Karl Kruszelnicki (born 1948), Australian television and radio personality
 Karl Künstler (1901–1945), German Nazi SS concentration camp commandant
 Karl Lagerfeld (1933–2019), German fashion designer
 Karl Landsteiner (1868–1943), Austrian biologist and physician
 Karl Lauterbach (born 1963), German Federal Minister of Health
 Karl Leo Heinrich Lehmann (1894–1960) was a German-born American art historian, archaeologist, and professor.
 Karl Linnas (1919–1987), Estonian Nazi concentration camp commandant
 Karl Lucas (born 1972), English actor and comedian
 Karl Malden (1912–2009), American actor
 Karl Malone (born 1963), American basketball player
 Karl Maron (1903–1975), German politician
 Karl Marx (1818–1883), Prussian philosopher, father of historical materialism
 Karl Möckel (1901–1948), German Nazi SS officer at Auschwitz concentration camp executed for war crimes
 Karl Moik (1938–2015), Austrian television presenter and singer 
 Karl Nehammer (born 1972), Austrian politician
 Karl Olive (born 1969), French sports journalist and politician
 Karl von Oberkamp (1893–1947), German SS commander executed for war crimes
 Karl Pearson (1857–1936), English statistician
 Karl Pilkington (born 1972), English podcaster, author and former radio producer
 Karl Platen (1877–1952), German actor
 Karl Popper (1902–1994), Austrian/British philosopher
 Karl Power, British prankster
 Karl Rahm (1907–1947), German SS officer, commandant of the Theresienstadt concentration camp executed for war crimes
 Karl Rapp (1882–1962), German engineer
 Karl Rove (born 1950), American political advisor
 Karl Schiewerling (1951–2021), German politician
 Karl Heinz Schnell (1915–2013), German jet pilot during WW II
 Karl Eberhard Schöngarth (1903–1946), German Nazi SS war criminal, executed for war crimes
 Karl Shiels (1971–2019), Irish actor
 Karl Schlyter (1879–1959), Swedish jurist and politician
 Karl Singer (born 1943), American football player
 Karl Söllner, (1903-1986), German-Austrian chemist
 Karl Stefanovic (born 1971), Australian television presenter
 Karl Streibel (1903–1986), German Nazi SS concentration camp commandant
 Karl Svoboda (1929–2022), Austrian politician
 Karl Urban (born 1972), New Zealand actor
 Karl Virtanen (born 1971), Sweden-Finnish journalist
 Karl Edward Wagner (1945–1994), American writer, editor and publisher
 Karl Wallenda (1905–1978), German-born tightrope artist
 Karl Weierstrass (1815–1897), German mathematician
 Karl Wendlinger (born 1968), Austrian race car driver
 Karl Michael Ziehrer (1843–1922), Austrian composer

Surname
 Andy Karl (born 1973), American actor and singer
 Coby Karl (born 1983), American basketball player
 Elfriede Karl (born 1933), Austrian politician
 George Karl (born 1951), American basketball coach
 Jonathan Karl (born 1968), American political journalist
 Mary Brennan Karl (1893–1948), American educator
 Terry Karl, professor of Latin American Studies at Stanford University

Fictional characters
 Karl C. Agathon, a fictional character in the re-imagined Battlestar Galactica series
 Karl Mayer, divorce attorney and ex-husband of Susan Mayer on Desperate Housewives
 Karl Morgenthau, the first Marvel Comics supervillain known as Flag-Smasher
 Karl Stromberg, the main antagonist in the 1977 James Bond film The Spy Who Loved Me
 Karl Walken, fictional Black Cat mayor

See also

 Karli (name)
 Karol (name)
 Karyl
 Rígsþula (Churl)

References

German masculine given names
Swedish masculine given names
Norwegian masculine given names
Danish masculine given names
Estonian masculine given names
Icelandic masculine given names
Finnish masculine given names
Dutch masculine given names
German-language surnames
English masculine given names